Sergey Andreyevich Muromtsev (5 October [O.S. 23 September] 1850 – 4 October 1910) was a Russian lawyer and politician, and chairman of the First Imperial Duma in 1906.

Muromtsev was a Russian nobleman from Tula and a Professor of Roman Law at Moscow University. In 1893, he and his wife Marya built the Muromtsev Dacha in Moscow. In the late 19th century, he was among the creators of the Constitutional Democratic Party, better known as the KD or Cadet party, of which he was chairman for several years. In April 1906, he was elected as a representative for Moscow in the First Duma, of which he was then elected chairman (or president) on 10 May. He tried to maintain some degree of order and dignity in this difficult assembly, which is often known as the "Duma of the Public Anger".

He was much praised for the way he chaired the debates, always keeping to the strictest legality but always pursuing a constitutional and anti-autocratic agenda. Despite his efforts, the Duma was dissolved on 21 July 1906, by Imperial ukase of tsar Nicholas II. Muromtsev wanted the elected Duma to continue its work and proposed that it should retreat to Finland. For signing this appeal, he was imprisoned for some months and could not be re-elected in the later Dumas.

His funeral, at the New Donskoy Cemetery on 7 October 1910, was the occasion of one of the first public demonstrations of support for constitutional ideas since the dissolution of the Duma. His niece, Vera Muromtseva, was the wife of Ivan Bunin, a celebrated Russian author.

Contributions to jurisprudence
In the 1870s, he advanced the then-novel sociological approach for the study of law, employing the functional (функционального) and historical comparative ("историко-сравнительного") methods. Muromtsev was a staunch opponent of formalism and positivism.

From 1879 to 1892, Muromtsev was the co-editor, along with Maksim Kovalevsky of the law journal Juridical Vestnik («Юридический Вестник»).

See also
List of Russian legal historians
Russian legal history

External links

 Biography

1850 births
1910 deaths
Politicians from Saint Petersburg
People from Sankt-Peterburgsky Uyezd
Russian nobility
Russian Constitutional Democratic Party members
Chairmen of the State Duma (Russian Empire)
Members of the 1st State Duma of the Russian Empire
Lawyers from Moscow
Russian tax resisters
Legal history of Russia
Burials at Donskoye Cemetery
Academic staff of Moscow State University